A by-election was held for the Australian House of Representatives seat of Boothby on 11 November 1911. This was triggered by the death of Labour MP Lee Batchelor.

The by-election was won by Liberal candidate David Gordon.

Results

References

1911 elections in Australia
South Australian federal by-elections